The Muisk vole (Microtus mujanensis) is a species of rodent in the family Cricetidae.
It is found only in Russia.

References

 Baillie, J. 1996.  Microtus mujanensis.   2006 IUCN Red List of Threatened Species.   Downloaded on 19 July 2007.
Musser, G. G. and M. D. Carleton. 2005. Superfamily Muroidea. pp. 894–1531 in Mammal Species of the World a Taxonomic and Geographic Reference. D. E. Wilson and D. M. Reeder eds. Johns Hopkins University Press, Baltimore.

Microtus
Mammals described in 1978
Mammals of Russia
Taxonomy articles created by Polbot